The Colorado Open is the Colorado state open golf tournament, open to both amateur and professional golfers. It is organized by the Colorado Open Golf Foundation. It has been played annually since 1964 at a variety of courses around the state.

Winners

2022 Wil Collins
2021 Alex Weiss
2020 Mark Anguiano
2019 Sam Saunders
2018 Dru Love
2017 Jonathan Kaye
2016 Neil Johnson
2015 Jimmy Gunn
2014 Ian Davis
2013 Zahkai Brown
2012 Derek Tolan
2011 Ben Portie
2010 Nate Lashley
2009 Derek Tolan
2008 Brian Guetz
2007 John Douma
2006 Dustin White
2005 Wil Collins
2004 Bill Loeffler
2003 No tournament
2002 Kevin Stadler
2001 Brett Wayment
2000 Scott Petersen
1999 Bill Riddle
1998 Shane Bertsch
1997 Doug Dunakey
1996 Jonathan Kaye
1995 Mike Zaremba
1994 Brian Guetz (amateur)
1993 Bill Loeffler
1992 Brandt Jobe
1991 Bill Loeffler
1990 Bob Betley
1989 Chris Endres
1988 Steve Jones
1987 James Blair
1986 Mark Wiebe
1985 Al Geiberger
1984 Willie Wood
1983 James Blair
1982 Dan Halldorson
1981 Dave Hill
1980 Larry Webb
1979 Larry Mowry
1978 Paul Purtzer
1977 Dave Hill
1976 Dave Hill
1975 Pat Rea
1974 Gary Longfellow (amateur)
1973 Bill Johnston
1972 Gene Torres
1971 Dave Hill
1970 Wright Garrett
1969 Ted Hart
1968 Vic Kline
1967 Bill Bisdorf
1966 Bob Pratt
1965 Bill Bisdorf
1964 Bill Bisdorf

External links
Colorado Open Golf Foundation - official site
List of winners

Golf in Colorado
State Open golf tournaments
Recurring sporting events established in 1964
1964 establishments in Colorado